The United Nations Educational, Scientific and Cultural Organization (UNESCO) designates World Heritage Sites of outstanding universal value to cultural or natural heritage which have been nominated by signatories to the 1972 UNESCO World Heritage Convention. Cultural heritage consists of monuments (such as architectural works, monumental sculptures, or inscriptions), groups of buildings, and sites (including archaeological sites). Natural features (consisting of physical and biological formations), geological and physiographical formations (including habitats of threatened species of animals and plants), and natural sites which are important from the point of view of science, conservation or natural beauty, are defined as natural heritage. Cambodia ratified the convention on 28 November 1991.

, Cambodia has three sites on the list. Angkor was listed in 1992 when the country was briefly governed by the United Nations mission after the Cambodian–Vietnamese War, in line with the 1991 Paris Peace Agreements. The site was immediately placed on the List of World Heritage in Danger in order to quickly and efficiently deal with urgent problems of conservation. In 2004, Angkor was removed from the endangered list. The Temple of Preah Vihear was listed in 2008 and the Sambor Prei Kuk temple complex in 2018. All three sites are cultural. In addition, Cambodia has eight sites on its tentative list.

World Heritage Sites 
UNESCO lists sites under ten criteria; each entry must meet at least one of the criteria. Criteria i through vi are cultural, and vii through x are natural.

Tentative list
In addition to sites inscribed on the World Heritage List, member states can maintain a list of tentative sites that they may consider for nomination. Nominations for the World Heritage List are only accepted if the site was previously listed on the tentative list. , Cambodia lists eight properties on its tentative list.

See also
Tourism in Cambodia
Khmer Culture
List of Protected Areas in Cambodia

References

Cambodia

Cambodia geography-related lists
World Heritage Sites